Worcester Park is a suburban town in South West London, England. It lies in the London boroughs of Sutton and Kingston, and partly in the Surrey borough of Epsom and Ewell. The suburb's population was 16,031 at the time of the 2001 census.

The Worcester Park post town, which is coterminous with the KT4 postcode district, covers all of the suburb and also extends into Old Malden. 

The Beverley Brook runs through Worcester Park, alongside Green Lane and past Green Lane Primary School and Cheam Common Junior School for the special needs, traversing up to Cuddington Recreation Ground.  Green Lane appears in the Domesday Book. The Huntsmans Hall (now The Brook) was situated on what was the far boundary of a hunting ground for Henry VIII.

History

Early History
 
Worcester Park takes its name from the 4th Earl of Worcester, who was appointed Keeper of the Great Park of Nonsuch in 1606. The area was once part of the Great Park which covered around 1100 acres and was adjacent to the Little Park which contained Nonsuch Palace of Henry VIII. Both parks were originally used as deer parks. Henry VIII had obtained the land from Sir Richard de Codington.

During the ownership by Sir Richard de Codington, there was a manor house on a site which was later replaced by Worcester House and is now the site of Worcester Close. There was also a church of St. Mary on roughly the same site where the church of St Mary the Virgin, Cuddington, now stands.

In 1809 Worcester Park was acquired by William Taylor. He used a mill on the banks of the Hogsmill River to continue the manufacture of gunpowder which had been carried out on and off in the area for several decades. Manufacturing continued until the 1850s when the mill blew up.

In 1890 Worcester Park Baptist Church was formed in Longfellow Road. It moved to its present location on The Avenue in the 1950s.

20th Century: Suburban residential development

The Worcester Park area was largely rural before the opening of the railway station in the 1920s. The majority of the district was constructed on by housing in the 1920s and 30s. The south of district was built on in the 1960s following the closure of the Worcester Park Brick Works. Other pockets of 1960/70s development can be seen scattered across the Worcester Park area.

21st Century: The Hamptons and Mayflower Park

The Hamptons is an early 21st-century St James Homes estate of mainly New England (Colonial Revival) style housing in the northeast of Worcester Park. It lies within the London Borough of Sutton.

The site has with appropriate civic engineering been converted to a conservation wetland, amphitheatre, community centre and gym, tennis courts (for residents) and a viewing platform with views to the City of London and c. 1000 homes: apartments to large detached houses.  Dutch style/Dutch Colonial Revival houses were added towards the end of re-engineering, landscaping and construction in the ten years to 2013.

The green space itself is called Mayflower Park which includes a grass amphitheatre for performances and an area of five wetlands as a nature reserve. The official public opening of the park was at the end of July 2006.

In 2019 a fire destroyed Richmond house in the Hamptons development leaving 23 families homeless. A post event structural survey conducted by Probyn Miers found that the fire was able to spread at an uncontrollable speed due to multiple breaches of building regulations at design and build level by the developer Berkeley homes. They have yet to compensate the residents.

Localities

Parker's Field
Possibly belonging to T Parker & Sons, Landscapers, who were based at what is now a housing estate at  beside Worcester Park Station, Parker's Field was a popular toboggan run until a housing estate was built on a large part of it in the 1970s (despite being Green Belt).

Rowe Hall
This headquarters was erected after the previous building was destroyed by arsonists and still serves the 2nd Cuddington (Rowe) Scout Group. Miss Rowe was the third-form teacher at Blakesley School, a private primary school owned by Mr and Mrs Eric Dudley, and highly esteemed Akela of the 2nd Cuddington (Blakesley) Cub pack from its founding in the early 1940s to the 1960s.

Worcester (Park) House

In the 1950s, the ruins of an ornamental lake with a multi-arched bridge and balustrade were still visible in the woodland at the foot of a hill in Parker's Field. The house itself was not visible, nor were there any ruins apart from the lake and some mounds of bricks. The lake itself had drained into the Hogsmill River, but no source of incoming water was visible. The lake dried up in the late 1940s following the rechannelling of the river.

Close to the bridge remnant to the south-west of the bridge was a ruined domed structure, all that remains of an ice house. However, it was filled with soil and other debris which prevented any investigation.

Locals presumed the house to be named "Worcester Park House", and have suggested that Blakesley School was the original house, while historical sources suggest "Worcester House". However, the map of 1871 shows a building labelled "Worcester Park House" to be alongside the lake, to the west of it, on land that was, in the 1950s, overgrown with trees. Documents from HM Land Registry show that the name of the building for Blakesley School was Worcester Court.

Nearby places

Demographics 
In 2011, around 78% of residents of Worcester Park ward were White, with 3.6% mixed race, 4.8% Asian or British Asian, 2.0% Black and 3.3% Chinese or of another ethnic group.

Education

Cheam Common Infants and Junior schools
Cheam Common Infants and Junior schools are pre-World War II school buildings. Air raid shelters were found underground during an extension to the main building of the junior school. The school is located at the top of the high street.

Cuddington School
A primary school on Salisbury Road in the south of the district, near the border with Stoneleigh. Near the Mead Infant and Auriol Junior Schools, over the border into Stoneleigh.

Linden Bridge School
A co-educational special school catering for children and young adults with Autism. Pupils range from ages 4 to 19. Located on Grafton Road, in the south-west of the district, in Epsom and Ewell.

In literature
Worcester Park is the site of the enormous launch structure built to pioneer crewed flight in the short story "The Argonauts of the Air" by H. G. Wells, written in 1895.

Economy
Central Road (A2043), roughly half a mile in length forms the focal point of Worcester Park.  It hosts a number of shops, banks, estate agents, building societies, solicitors, restaurants, pubs and coffee bars including Starbucks, Caffè Nero, Pizza Express, Costa Coffee, and Nando's. In their sum, these include both multiples and independents, one of them being Ross Fruiterers.   The largest store is a branch of the Waitrose supermarket chain.

Along with neighbouring North Cheam, Worcester Park is a beneficiary of the Mayor of London's "Outer London Fund". See section below.

Outer London Fund
During 2011/12 Worcester Park and neighbouring North Cheam won nearly £2m from the Mayor of London's Outer London Fund for improvements to the local area. Sutton Council has begun a collaborative project, steered by Councillors and community stakeholders, to spend the money on making improvements to the public realm and supporting the development and growth of businesses in the town centres.

Sutton Council's bid for the money stated that: "In The London Plan, London's Mayor recognises the strategic importance of supporting town centres as key locations for a diverse range of activities. Town centres are key nodes for effective land use and transport integration, a focus for local communities, enhance quality of life, and are key focal points for regeneration initiatives. Both Worcester Park and North Cheam are recognised as part of a network of District Centres in London by the Mayor. In this way, they play an important role in the Borough [of Sutton]. Their development is also strategic: the long term growth strategy for Sutton identified in Sutton's Core Strategy, identifies both as ‘Centres for Intensification’ where renewal will largely be achieved through residential and mixed use development." It also notes that: "Network Rail are willing to build on plans to make enhancements to Worcester Park Station, working with the Council to make a welcoming and distinctive arrival to Worcester Park."

Transport

Rail
Worcester Park railway station is in Zone 4, served by the National Rail services of South Western Railway and is on the boundary with the Royal Borough of Kingston upon Thames. Worcester Park station is a Category C station (provides important rail feeder services on a busy trunk route with between £2m and £20m in ticket revenues per annum).

The railway line runs from London Waterloo, via Wimbledon and Worcester Park to Epsom, Dorking and Guildford. Worcester Park is approximately a 25-minute journey to London Waterloo by train with trains typically running every 15 minutes during the day, with additional services during morning and evening peak periods.

There were plans to improve station facilities and rail services at Worcester Park during 2012–13. Network Rail notified Kingston council of its intention to extend the length of platforms at Worcester Park Station. This will allow extra passenger capacity as trains can be increased from 8 carriages to 10 in length.

There was a petition in early 2014 to get Crossrail 2 to stop at Worcester Park railway station.

Also, under the Department for Transport's Access for All scheme – a disabled access fund to create obstacle-free routes to, from and between trains – Worcester Park station was made accessible to wheelchair users and those with pushchairs etc. on both platforms, with the construction of a new footbridge containing a two lifts, one at each end.

Notable residents
Jimmy Hill, footballer for Fulham Football Club and BBC TV Football commentator.
William Holman Hunt, 1827–1910, Pre-Raphaelite artist, painted The Light of the World at Worcester Park Farm, while staying there in the early 1850s with John Everett Millais.
 David Stockton, former reprographic assistant at The Christie. 
John Major – Prime Minister from 1990 to 1997, lived here as a boy at 260 Longfellow Road, Worcester Park from 1943 to 1955.
Roger Mayer – sound engineer, most notable for his development of the fuzz box.
Daley Thompson, British decathlete, lived near The Plough public house.
H. G. Wells, author, lived in The Avenue.
Kenneth Wolstenholme, BBC television sports commentator, remembered for the phrase "They think it's all over" in the 1966 FIFA World Cup Final.

Sport and recreation
Worcester Park Cricket Club is located on Green Lane.
Worcester Park Athletic Club is also on Green Lane.
Worcester Park Football Club is based at Skinner's Field, on Green Lane. The club was founded in 1908.
Cazbar FC based at the Cazbar in Central Road play at Manor Park. Cazbar FC was founded in 2008 and now plays out of the Malden Manor Pub under the same name Cazbar FC.
Wandgas Football Club is located on Grafton Road and also has cricket teams.

Parks and open spaces
Auriol Park, a King George's Field, in the Borough of Epsom & Ewell. Located in Stoneleigh but in the Worcester Park postcode
Shadbolt Park, also in the borough of Epsom and Ewell.
 Dancer Dick Wood, accessible from Auriol Park Close. Located 100 yards north of Auriol Park, on the corner of Salisbury Road and Cromwell Road
The Hogsmill Open Space, in the north west, bordering Ewell, Tolworth and Old Malden 
 Cuddington Recreation Ground on St Clair Drive in the London Borough of Sutton.  
Mayflower Park in the Hamptons open space in the north, towards Motspur Park

See also List of King George V Playing Fields (Surrey) under the entry for Worcester Park.

Notes

Bibliography

References 
Sutton London Borough Council information about Worcester Park

External links 
Worcester Park Information

Areas of London
Districts of the London Borough of Sutton
District centres of London